Pierre Benoît Soult (19 July 1770 – 7 May 1843) joined the French royal army before the French Revolution. He fought in the French Revolutionary Wars, emerging from the conflict as colonel of a cavalry regiment. A good deal of his early career was spent as aide-de-camp to his brother Nicolas Soult who became Marshal in 1804. Transferred to Spain during the Napoleonic Wars, he first led a corps cavalry brigade, then after 1813 he commanded a cavalry division. During the Peninsular War he took part in the 1814 Battle of Orthez where he commanded 2,700 cavalry and watched the river line upstream (east) from the town of Orthez. He also saw action during the Hundred Days after Napoleon returned from exile in Elba. After 1830, he was brought out of retirement when his brother became part of the government. SOULT, P. is one of the names inscribed under the Arc de Triomphe.

References
 Gates, David. The Spanish Ulcer: A History of the Peninsular War. London: Pimlico, 2002. 
 Glover, Michael. The Peninsular War 1807-1814. London: Penguin, 2001. 
 Smith, Digby. The Napoleonic Wars Data Book. London: Greenhill, 1998. 

French generals
French Republican military leaders of the French Revolutionary Wars
French commanders of the Napoleonic Wars
1770 births
1843 deaths
People from Tarn (department)
Recipients of the Legion of Honour
Names inscribed under the Arc de Triomphe